The 1970 UCI Road World Championships took place from 13 to 16 August 1970 at Mallory Park in Leicester, United Kingdom.

Results

Medal table

External links 

 Men's results
 Women's results
  Results at sportpro.it

 
UCI Road World Championships by year
UCI Road World Championships 1970
Uci Road World Championships
Uci Road World Championships
Uci Road World Championships